Oxygen: A Worship Album is the ninth studio album by Lincoln Brewster on Integrity Music.

Reception

Indicating in a four star review by CCM Magazine, Bert Saraco depicts, "Brewster keeps things musically fresh and gets some extra points for some fiery guitar breaks." Jeremy Armstrong, in a four and a half star review from Worship Leader, recognizing, "Oxygen is certainly his strongest effort in recent history". In agreement with the four and a half star rating is Caitlin Lassiter of New Release Tuesday, describing, "Oxygen seems to be the perfect mix of emotions." Nathan Key, writes a three and a half star review for HM Magazine, realizing, "Oxygen would have been better served by cutting a few songs." Lins Honeyman, allocating a nine out of ten rating upon the album from Cross Rhythms, says, "another quality slice of praise from one of America's most experienced worship artists." Signaling in a three and a half star review for Jesus Freak Hideout, Bert Gangl derides, "Of course, cracks are bound to show in the proverbial pavement of just about any musical project." Jono Davies, rating the album four stars at Louder Than the Music, writes, "This is more than just another solid album from Lincoln, these songs are happy songs that will leave you with a smile on your face, and if you like to dance, go and dance in worship." Rating the album 3.0 out of five for Christian Music Review, Logan Merrick says, "Oxygen is a solid record."

Track listing

Personnel 

 Lincoln Brewster – lead vocals, backing vocals, lead guitars, keyboards, programming, bass guitar, drums, arrangements
 Colby Wedgeworth – guitars, keyboards, programming, bass guitar, drums, arrangements, backing vocals 
 Roman Vysochin – keyboards
 Peter Burton – bass guitar, backing vocals 
 Mike Johns – drums
 Kelly Caldwell – backing vocals 
 Rachel Jackson – backing vocals 
 Corbin Phillips – backing vocals 
 Margie Ruiz – backing vocals 
 Sarah Sherratt – backing vocals

Production
 Lincoln Brewster – producer, engineer
 Colby Wedgeworth – producer, engineer, mixing
 Michael Coleman – executive producer
 C. Ryan Dunham – executive producer
 Chico Gonzalez – A&R
 Mike Johns – assistant engineer
 Corbin Phillips – assistant engineer
 Wilson Wedgeworth – assistant engineer
 Brandon Yip – assistant engineer
 Scott Sanchez – mastering
 Dave Taylor – production coordination
 Thom Hoyman – creative director
 Jeremy Cowart – photography
 Ben DeRienzo – art direction, design

Charts

References

2014 albums
Lincoln Brewster albums